Daughter of the Sea (Spanish: La hija del mar) is a 1953 Spanish drama film directed by Antonio Momplet and starring Virgilio Teixeira, Isabel de Castro and Manuel Luna. It is based on a play by Àngel Guimerà which had previously been turned into a 1917. It goes on about a girl who survives a bot crash and reaches an island where she is different from everyone. She falls in love and some tragedies occur.

Synopsis 
When old Antón died, he left his daughter, Mariona, and her goddaughter, Águeda, picked up in a shipwreck, under the care of Uncle Roque. This, insidiously, takes over all the assets of the deceased, turns Águeda into the Cinderella of the house and wants to force Mariona to marry her son Pablo de Ella.  But Mariona maintains a secret relationship with Tomás Pedro, a fisherman who works for her uncle. So that no one suspects her, she hatches a stratagem to pretend that Tomás Pedro is in love with Águeda. Poor Cinderella believes it and, with her kindness and her natural charm, she really captivates Tomás Pedro. When Mariona found out about it, she caused Pablo's death and received her punishment at the hands of Uncle Roque.

Cast
 Virgilio Teixeira as Tomás Pedro  
 Isabel de Castro as Mariona  
 Manuel Luna as Tío Roque  
 Carlos Otero as Pablo 
 Nicolás D. Perchicot as Sacerdote  
 Jesús Colomer
 Ramona Cubexes
 Mercedes de la Aldea 
 Emilio Fábregas 
 Luis Induni 
 Fernando Martínez 
 Faustina Nieto 
 María Luisa Parona 
 Juana Soler

References

Bibliography 
 Bentley, Bernard. A Companion to Spanish Cinema. Boydell & Brewer 2008.

External links 
 

1953 drama films
Spanish drama films
1953 films
1950s Spanish-language films
Films based on works by Àngel Guimerà
Films directed by Antonio Momplet
Remakes of Spanish films

Sound film remakes of silent films
Cifesa films
Spanish black-and-white films
Films scored by Augusto Algueró
1950s Spanish films